John Price (29 August 1918 – 18 April 2013) was an English professional footballer born in Horden, County Durham, who played in the Football League in the 1930s for Hartlepools United and York City. He played as a forward.

References

1918 births
2013 deaths
People from Horden
Footballers from County Durham
English footballers
Association football forwards
Portsmouth F.C. players
Wolverhampton Wanderers F.C. players
Hartlepool United F.C. players
York City F.C. players
English Football League players